Nadezhda Stepanova (married name Nadezhda Galyamova, ; born 22 July 1959) is a Russian former long-distance runner. Her sole international medals of note came at the 1989 IAAF World Cross Country Championships, where she was silver medallist behind France's Annette Sergent in the senior women's race and led the Soviet women to the team title with the help of Yelena Romanova, Natalya Sorokivskaya and Regina Chistyakova. She competed in distance track events in the mid-1980s.

References

External links

Living people
1959 births
Soviet female long-distance runners
Russian female long-distance runners
Soviet female cross country runners
Russian female cross country runners